Clotworthy O'Neill was an Irish politician.

O'Neill was educated at Trinity College, Dublin. He was MP for Randalstown in County Antrim from  1746 to 1749.

References

Irish MPs 1727–1760
Alumni of Trinity College Dublin